Park Road railway station is the junction station for the Gold Coast and Cleveland lines in Queensland, Australia. It serves the Brisbane suburb of Woolloongabba.

It is served by Beenleigh, Cleveland and Gold Coast line services. Immediately south of the station lies a triangle junction with the Cleveland and Fisherman Islands lines branching off.

History
In September 1930, the standard gauge NSW North Coast line opened to the west of the station. On 12 November 1942, a wartime siding opened at Park Road, followed by a second on 28 February 1944. After falling out of use in 1945, the yard was reactivated in 1949. In its later years, it was primarily used by paper trains for Queensland Newspapers. It closed again in the early 1990s.

As part of the construction of the Gold Coast line, the standard gauge line was converted to dual gauge to allow these services to be segregated from Beenleigh and Cleveland services. In 2000, a project commenced to add a fourth track and platform face between the existing lines, as well as add a platform face to the dual gauge line.

Platform 4 was intended for use by Gold Coast trains but the curvature of the platform was deemed unsafe for commuter train usage. In preparation for sweeping changes across the City network on 20 January 2014, the use of platform 4 at Park Road was trialled from 13 January, before opening for selected Gold Coast services on 20 January.

During an extended 10-day track closure from 25 December 2021 to 3 January 2022, Park Road Station was closed including tracks from it to Yeerongpilly Station and Lindum Station. This allowed for works to move the Up Beenleigh track 40-50m to the east following the Dual Gauge unwired flyover, to support the final alignment of Cross River Rail southern portal. The section of track from Dutton Park Station that allowed access to Platform 2 at Park Road Station was also removed permanently, resulting in all trains from the Down Beenleigh track servicing Platform 3 at Park Road.

The dual gauge track between Dutton Park Station and Platform 4 at Park Road Station remains closed due to Cross River Rail works.

Services
Park Road station is served by Beenleigh, Cleveland and Gold Coast line services.

Services by platform

Transport links
Adjacent to the station lies Boggo Road busway station that is served by Brisbane Transport services. The future Boggo Road railway station is due to open in 2024 and will provide interchange with Park Road.

References

External links

Park Road station Queensland Rail
Park Road station Queensland's Railways on the Internet
[ Park Road station] TransLink travel information

Railway stations in Brisbane
Woolloongabba